Rhabdias pseudosphaerocephala is a species of parasitic nematodes in the family Rhabdiasidae. It was first found in lungs of the cane toad Bufo marinus in Costa Rica and Nicaragua. It can be confused with Rhabdias sphaerocephala, described from toads in Europe, yet differs from the latter by its head-end morphology and in sequences of rDNA.

References

Further reading
Kelehear, C., J. K. Webb, and R. Shine. "Rhabdias pseudosphaerocephala infection in Bufo marinus: lung nematodes reduce viability of metamorph cane toads." Parasitology 136.08 (2009): 919–927.
Pizzatto, Ligia, Catherine M. Shilton, and Richard Shine. "Infection dynamics of the lungworm Rhabdias pseudosphaerocephala in its natural host, the cane toad (Bufo marinus), and in novel hosts (native Australian frogs)."Journal of Wildlife Diseases 46.4 (2010): 1152-1164.
Dubey, Sylvain, and Richard Shine. "Origin of the parasites of an invading species, the Australian cane toad (Bufo marinus): are the lungworms Australian or American?." Molecular Ecology 17.20 (2008): 4418–4424.

External links

Rhabditida
Nematodes described in 2007